Bhaktavatsalam Vidyashram is a one of the best school in Chennai, Korattur, India. It was founded in 1989 and mainly follows the CBSE standard of education, though a separate Tamil Nadu state board certifies high schools. It is named after the former Chief Minister of Tamil Nadu, M. Bhaktavatsalam. The school has more than 3000 students.

The Bhaktavatsalam memorial trust is chaired by Mrs. K. Maragathamani and Trustee Mr. S.G. Varun Krisana heads the institution.

History

Bhaktavatsalam Vidhyashram opened on 18 June 1990 with 770 students. It became a full-fledged senior secondary school affiliated to CBSE.

The state board pattern was adopted in April 2003 with class XI. The next year XII was added.

Operations 
It is run by the Bhaktavatsalam Memorial Trust chaired by chairman and managing trustee Dr. K. V. Kuppusamy. Sarojini Varadappan is the correspondent.

Extracurricular activities 
Clubs include Interact Club, International Award for young People, Philately Club, Scouts and Guides led by The Bharat Scouts and Guides, Karuna Club, Astronomy Club, and Nature Club.

Arts, crafts, physical education, and music are offered.  Students beginning from class 6 have access to the school library . Other features include the computer lab, mathematics lab, and labs for physics, chemistry and biology. The school can be reached by private vans, government buses and local trains.

Uniform

Boys
Std I - V
 Light blue Checked shirt with navy blue shorts
 Black lace shoes with black socks

Std VI to XII
 Light blue Checked shirt with navy blue pant
 Black lace shoes with black socks

Red checked shirt with monogram and dark cream full pants and school belt

Girls 
Std I to V

 Light blue checked shirt with navy blue pinafore
 Black lace shoes with black socks

Std VI and XII

 Light blue salwar with checked khameez and navy blue waist coat
 Black lace shoes with black socks

Dark cream salwar and red checked khammex with dark cream waist coat

Symbols
The school emblem represents a teacher sitting under the tree with fruits, teaching students. The tree represents the teacher's experience. The fruits represent the knowledge given by the teacher to students.

The school motto is "Thamasoma Jyothir Gamaya", which translates from Sanskrit to "Lead me from darkness to light"

References

External links
School website

Primary schools in Tamil Nadu
High schools and secondary schools in Tamil Nadu
Schools in Chennai